Petrus Erasmus van Zyl (born 14 September 1989) is a South African rugby union footballer who plays as a scrum-half for Stade Français Paris rugby.

Career

Van Zyl was born in Pretoria, however he is a product of the famous Grey College school in Bloemfontein.  He made his  debut in 2010 and his impressive domestic performances saw him promoted to the  side for the 2012 Super Rugby season. To date he has played over 50 times in all competitions for the Cheetahs.

On 30 July 2013, the  announced that he would join them after the 2013 Currie Cup Premier Division season.

In October 2017, Van Zyl announced that he would retire from South African rugby to return to his family farm in Vrede, although he would consider an international move. In December, it was announced that he would join English side London Irish in 2018, which was confirmed by his new side on 4 January.

International

Van Zyl earned his first international call up ahead of South Africa's second match in the 2013 mid-year rugby union tests, taking the place of the injured Jano Vermaak in the squad. He made his Springbok debut against  on 15 June replacing Ruan Pienaar in the 69th minute of the match at the Mbombela Stadium in Nelspruit in a 30–17 win for the home side.

In 2016, Van Zyl was included in a South Africa 'A' squad that played a two-match series against a touring England Saxons team. He came on as a replacement in their first match in Bloemfontein and scored a 64th-minute try for his side, but ended on the losing side as the visitors ran out 32–24 winners. He then started the second match of the series, a 26–29 defeat to the Saxons in George.

References

Living people
1989 births
South African rugby union players
South Africa international rugby union players
Rugby union scrum-halves
Cheetahs (rugby union) players
Free State Cheetahs players
Bulls (rugby union) players
Rugby union players from Pretoria
Afrikaner people
Alumni of Grey College, Bloemfontein